Walter Gay (January 22, 1856July 13, 1937) was an American painter noted both for his genre paintings of French peasants, paintings of opulent interior scenes and was a notable art collector.

Early life

Walter Gay was born on January 22, 1856, in Hingham, Massachusetts, into an established New England family. He was the son of Ebenezer and Ellen Blake (née Blood) Gay. His uncle was the Boston painter Winckworth Allan Gay, who introduced the young man to the art community.

Career
In 1876, Gay and his wife moved to Paris, France, where he became a pupil of Léon Bonnat. A fellow student during this period was John Singer Sargent with whom Gay developed a friendship. Bonnat encouraged the young artist to travel to Spain, where he studied and copied the work of Velázquez. He also encountered the work of Spanish artist, Mariano Fortuny. These artists became an important influences on Gay's brushwork, use of color and understanding of light.

Walter Gay received an honorable mention in the Paris Salon of 1885; a gold medal in 1888, and similar awards at Vienna (1894), Antwerp (1895), Berlin (1896) and Munich (1897). He was one of the few artists selected to represent the United States at the Exposition Universelle in Paris in 1889. He became an Officer of the Legion of Honor and a member of the Society of Secession, Munich. 

During his lifetime, his work was exhibited in every major European city: Antwerp, Berlin, Budapest, Vienna and Paris. In 1904, he was elected into the National Academy of Design as an Associate Academician.

Many young American artists who arrived in Paris in the late 19th-century became Gay's pupils to the extent that the New York Times dubbed him the "Dean of American Artists in Paris." His students who went on to have illustrious careers include: Henry Bacon.

His first compositions were still lifes, followed by depictions of 18th-century French peasant life. Later he shifted to genre scenes of realistic depictions of peasants and factory workers. 

However, beginning around 1895, he abandoned such simple peasant scenes, virtually creating a new genre with his depictions of luxurious interiors. He is most noted for these paintings of opulent interiors show-casing French chateaux and chic private homes. These painterly works display the luxurious detail of domestic interiors which included fine porcelain, furnishings, gilt mirrors, paintings and focused on the "spirit of an empty room" by avoiding the inclusion of figures.

Gay was also a notable art collector. Following his death in 1937, his widow donated some 200 works of Dutch, Italian, English and French paintings, drawings and illustrations to the Louvre indicating something of the collection's importance.

Personal life

He married Matilda E. Travers, the heiress daughter of William R. Travers, a prominent New York City investor and co-founder of Saratoga Race Course. His wife's fortune allowed the couple to live very comfortably. They divided their time between their country homes and their Paris apartment. In Paris, Gay and his wife lived in an apartment on the Left Bank and in 1907, purchased Chateau Le Bréau on a  walled park near the Forest of Fontainebleau. His wife maintained a diary of the couple's time in Europe.

Walter Gay died at Le Breu Dammarys les Lys, near Fontainebleau on 13 July 1937. 

His widow remained at their home in France which was taken over by German officers following the German occupation of France during World War II. A virtual prisoner in her own home, Matilda Travers Gay died there in 1943.

Awards and recognition
Gay was created Chevalier Legion of Honor in 1894; Officer Legion of Honor in 1906 and a Commander of the Legion of Honor in 1927. He was also awarded the honor of Life fellow Metropolitan Museum of Art, New York.

Selected works
Works by Gay are represented in many of the world's most prestigious art museums, including: the Luxembourg Museum, the Tate Gallery (London), and the Boston Museum of Fine Arts, the Metropolitan (New York), the Art Institute, the Frick in Pittsburgh, the Carnegie Museum of Art, the Smithsonian American Art Museum, Museum of Brussels, Pinacotheca Museum, Munich, Pennsylvania Academy of the Fine Arts, Albright Art Gallery and the Musée d'Orsay in Paris, France.
 Geraniums, n.d., before 1890
 Hollyhocks, n.d. before 1890
 The Spinners. 1885
 Les Tisseuses, (The Weavers),  1885
 Novembre, Etaples,  c. 1885 
 The Knife-grinder,  c. 1888
 Charity, 1889
 Benedicite (The Blessing) 1889 Museum at Amiens, France.
 Las Cigarreras (Cigar Makers, Seville), n.d., ca 1890
 The Music Room and Dining Room of Eben Howard Gay's House, Boston, 1902
 La Commode, 1905
 La Chaise-Longue, (Room in the Chateau de Bréau, near Paris), c. 1905 
 The Chinese Screen, after 1909
 The Artist's Study, Rue de la Universite 1910
 The Open Window - Le Breau, 1910
 The Green Salon, 1912 
 Salon of Comptesse Robert de Fitz-James, 1913 
 Blue and White, [Dining room of Mrs Josiah Bradlee, Boston], 1913
 Le Grand Salon, Musée Jacquemart-André, ca 1913 
 Feu de Cheminée dans un Intérieur, n.d.
 Boudoir, Chateau de Chaalis, 1914 
 The Ethan Frome Kitchen, 1922
 The Living Hall, 1928

Gallery

References

Walter Gay information at Nineteenth-Century Art Worldwide published by the Association of Historians of Nineteenth-Century Art

Specific

External links 
Walter Gay papers, Archives of American Art, Smithsonian Institution

1856 births
1937 deaths
19th-century American painters
American male painters
20th-century American painters
People from Hingham, Massachusetts
Officiers of the Légion d'honneur
Artists from Massachusetts
19th-century American male artists
20th-century American male artists
Members of the American Academy of Arts and Letters